The 1959 Christchurch mayoral election was part of the New Zealand local elections held that same year. In 1959, election were held for the Mayor of Christchurch plus other local government positions. The polling was conducted using the standard first-past-the-post electoral method.

Background
Sitting mayor George Manning was re-elected for a full term, with a decreased majority, opposed only by Harold Smith of the Citizens' Association. Smith was successful in winning a seat on the council and was appointed deputy mayor. The Citizens' Association won every council seat leaving Manning (who was also elected to the Harbour Board) as the only Labour Party elected representative in Christchurch. The overall anti-Labour vote (which was consistent nationwide) was attributed to the unpopularity of the then Labour government. Prime Minister Walter Nash commented simply "We seem to have held the mayoralties" in reference that in Christchurch (as well as in Wellington and Lower Hutt) Labour mayors were re-elected despite voters electing majority centre-right councils.

Mayoralty results
The following table gives the election results:

Councillor results

Table footnotes:
<noinclude>

References

Mayoral elections in Christchurch
1959 elections in New Zealand
Politics of Christchurch
November 1959 events in New Zealand
1950s in Christchurch